They've Got Us Right Where They Want Us, At Each Other's Throats is the upcoming eighth studio album by American rock band Filter. Originally conceived in 2018 as a follow-up to the band's first album, Short Bus titled Rebus, the project changed course due to the collapse of the PledgeMusic crowd funding platform. Despite this, some material from the sessions will still appear in the final release, while two other tracks were released in 2020 as singles. The album's title was changed to Murica in 2020 and was changed back to its current title in 2022. The album is scheduled for release in 2023.

Background and recording
After releasing their seventh studio album, Crazy Eyes (2016), and touring in support of it in 2017, frontman Richard Patrick turned to making new music in 2018. The start of the project was spurred by a particular event; Patrick was attending a Veruca Salt concert which also was being attended by original Filter member Brian Liesegang, who had left the band shortly after the release of their first album, the platinum selling Short Bus (1995) due to creative differences with Patrick. Knowing both were there, Veruca Salt member Louise Post stopped mid-concert to call both out, stating that they need to "bury any bullshit, forget the crap, and get their shit together" in regards to making new music together. The two took the message to heart, and decided to work on a new album together. By October 2018, they had announced the concept; the two decided on calling the album Rebus—an allusion to the only Filter album the two had worked together on—and centered the album's conception around the idea of recording a follow-up to that album, but with more modern sounds and concepts.

The band had planned to procure funding for the album creation process through crowd sourcing platform PledgeMusic. However, the band had gone quiet on the progress of the project through the mid-part of 2019, until July 2019, when Patrick announced that the collaboration with Liesegang had been cancelled due to the bankruptcy of the PledgeMusic company and "a variety of other reasons". He announced that the scope of the album would be changing - Liesegang would not be working on the album moving forward, and that it had changed names to They've Got Us Right Where They Want Us, At Each Other's Throats. Despite this, Patrick noted that he still hoped to include three of the songs that he had written with Liesegang on the album, titled "Murica", "Thoughts and Prayers", and "(Command-Z) High as a Muv Fucka".

Patrick once again went silent on the project until the release of the single "Thoughts and Prayers" in June 2020, where he announced it had been retitled again, to Murica, and that it was scheduled for release by the end of 2020. On October 29, the title track was released as a single along with its music video and album cover art. The video depicts Patrick as a far right wing Republican party supporter, causing tension among the band's fan base.

In 2022, Patrick announced in interviews on his Facebook page that he had changed the name back to They've Got Us Right Where They Want Us, At Each Other's Throats, that the album was now scheduled for a 2023 release on Golden Robot Records, and the two singles released in 2020 would not be on the album. In October 2022, the single "For the Beaten" was released, which Patrick now described as the album's first single.

Track listing
"(Command-Z) High as a Muv Fucka"
"Come Take My Guns"
"Summer Child"
"For the Beaten"

Personnel
Filter
 Richard Patrick – vocals, guitars, bass, programming

Additional musicians
 Zach Munowitz – guitar on "For the Beaten"

References

2023 albums
Filter (band) albums
Upcoming albums